Jaime Vásquez may refer to:
Jaime Vásquez (Chilean footballer) (1929–2015)
Jaime Vásquez (Peruvian footballer) (born 1991)